The RagWing RW22 Tiger Moth is a two-seats-in-tandem, biplane, conventional landing gear, single engine homebuilt aircraft designed by Roger Mann and sold as plans by RagWing Aircraft Designs for amateur construction.

The RW22 is an 80% scale replica of the de Havilland Tiger Moth and was developed using the original Tiger Moth design as a guide.

Design and development
The RW22 was designed for the US experimental homebuilt aircraft category and was first flown in June 1999. It also qualifies as an Experimental Light-sport aircraft in the USA.

The airframe is constructed from wood and tube and covered with aircraft fabric. The landing gear is of conventional configuration.

The RW22 was originally available as a complete quick-build kit, less only the engine, but today is only offered as plans and the designer estimates it will take 600 hours to complete the aircraft.

Specifications (RW22)

References

External links

Homebuilt aircraft